Echinocereus berlandieri (Berlandier's hedgehog cactus) is a species of hedgehog cactus. Its range includes most of South Texas, and is commonly found along the Nueces River and the lower Rio Grande.

References

berlandieri